Tauscher is a surname. Notable people with the surname include:

 Anna Maria Taucher (Maria Teresa of St. Joseph) (1855-1938), German religious
 Ellen Tauscher (1951–2019), American politician
 Hans Tauscher (1867-1941), German army officer
 Hansjörg Tauscher (born 1967), German alpine skier
 Johann Tauscher (1909-1979), Austrian field handball player
 Mark Tauscher (born 1977), American football player
 Walt Tauscher (1901–1992), American baseball player

See also 
 Tausch (disambiguation)
 Tauche
 Tauschia
 Tauscha
 Tausche (disambiguation)
 Tauscheria (disambiguation)

German-language surnames